Hugh E. Dierker (1890 – 1975) was an American film director and producer.

Biography
Dierker worked at Pathé. By 1920 he had established his own production company, Hugh Dierker Productions.

Junior Coghlan wrote about him in his autobiography. A photograph of him and Bebe Daniels appeared in the Los Angeles Herald April 14, 1922 in connection with a showing of his production When Dawn Came. His wife authored the story and is given a dedication on the associated songbook.

In 1912 he contracted for a garage building in Los Angeles.

Filmography
When Dawn Came (1920)
The Other Side (1922)
Cause for Divorce (1923)
 False Pride (1925)
Camille of the Barbary Coast (1925)
The Wrongdoers (1925) with Lionel Barrymore
Broken Homes (1926)
 Things Wives Tell (1926)

Further reading
"The True Story Is the Thing; Thinks Hugh Dierker, the Director," MW, September 19, 1925

References

External links
 

Silent film directors
American filmmakers